Jeong Yoon-cheol (born May 14, 1971) is a South Korean film director.

Career 
Jeong graduated from School of Film and Theater at Hanyang University. After his successful directorial debut with short film Memorial Picture, he was selected as a member of MAMPIST and studied film editing at the Australian Film Television and Radio School. His short film 
Hibernation was invited to the Clermont-Ferrand Film Festival in 1999 and won Best Director Award at the Shinyoung Film Festival.

In 2005 his heart-warming feature debut Marathon about an autistic athlete was a huge hit in Korea. His next movie was the comedy Shim's Family.

Filmography as director 
 Marathon (2005)
 Skeletons in the Closet aka Shim's Family (2007)
 A Man Who Was Superman (2008)
 Warriors of the Dawn (2017)

External links 
 
 
 

South Korean film editors
South Korean film producers
South Korean film directors
South Korean screenwriters
Hanyang University alumni
1971 births
Living people